Ephoria hezia is a moth in the Apatelodidae family. It was first described by Druce in 1899.

References

Natural History Museum Lepidoptera generic names catalog

Apatelodidae
Moths described in 1899